Spy City is a television miniseries created by William Boyd about spies in 1961 Berlin, during the Cold War.  The series first aired in Germany, and AMC+ picked up the rights to stream in the United States at MIPTV.

Synopsis 
A British spy is sent to Berlin in 1961 to uncover a mole in the United Kingdom's Embassy or among the Allies, shortly before the construction of the Berlin Wall.

Cast and characters 
 Dominic Cooper as Fielding Scott
  as Severine Bloch
 Leonie Benesch as Eliza Hahn
  as Reinhart
 Johanna Wokalek as Ulrike Faber
  as Conrad Greer
 Tom Ashley as George Brotherton
 Rupert Vansittart as Ian Stuart-Hay
 Adrian Lukis as Aldous Petrie
 Tonio Arango as August Froben
  as Vasily Lubkov
 Mark Zak as Viktor Kovrin

Episodes

Production 
Spy City entered development in 2014, when Boyd created and began writing the show.  It was initially planned to be a ten-episode series.  In 2019, Dominic Cooper was cast in the lead role. The series was shot in Roudnice nad Labem, Plzeň, Prague in Czech Republic, from 27 August to 30 November 2019, subbing for Berlin in 1960s. The series was co-produced by H&V Entertainment GmbH, ZDF, Seven Stories (UK) and Wilma Film (Czech Republic) and was supported by FFF Bavaria, Nordmedia, German Motion Picture Fund and Czech Film Fund.

Release 
Originally, all episodes were released in Germany on December 3, 2020 to the Magenta TV streaming service.  The series will be broadcast in Germany on ZDF in Fall 2021.  ViacomCBS Global Distribution has the international distribution rights, and at MIPTV, AMC Networks purchased the rights for the United States for AMC+. AMC+ is releasing the episodes on a weekly basis starting April 15, 2021. Britbox aired the series in the UK on December 23, 2021.

Reception 
The review aggregation website Rotten Tomatoes reports a 70% approval rating, based on 10 reviews, with an average rating of 6.5/10. Metacritic, calculated a weighted average score of 72 out of 100 based on 7 critics, indicating "generally favorable reviews".

References

External links 
 
 
 Spy City at Nordmedia

2020 German television series debuts
English-language television shows
Espionage television series
Television series about the Cold War
Works by William Boyd (writer)
Television series by Miramax Television
Television series set in 1961
Television shows set in Berlin
ZDF original programming
Secret Intelligence Service in fiction